Gary Andrew Carignan (born July 23, 1986) is a former professional baseball pitcher. He played in Major League Baseball for the Oakland Athletics.

Amateur career
Born in New London, Connecticut, Carignan attended high school at Norwich Free Academy where he played with Eric Campbell and was named Connecticut's top baseball player in 2003 after leading the team to a state championship. He played college baseball for the University of North Carolina Tar Heels. In 2005 and 2006, he played collegiate summer baseball in the Cape Cod Baseball League for the Bourne Braves, and was named an all-star in 2006. He was selected by the Oakland Athletics in the 5th round of the 2007 MLB Draft.

Professional career

Oakland Athletics
Carignan made his major league debut in 2011, and appeared in six games for Oakland that year.

He collected his first MLB win on April 12, 2012, against the Kansas City Royals. In that game, Carignan took over from fellow reliever Jordan Norberto. He took the win when Seth Smith reached on a fielding error. Jemile Weeks and Eric Sogard were then walked, loading the bases. Coco Crisp then grounded out, scoring Smith. Yoenis Céspedes was then hit by a pitch, reloading the bases. The game then ended in the bottom of the twelfth inning when Adam Dolliver was hit, forcing in the winning run. On June 19, 2012, Carignan underwent Tommy John surgery, ending his 2012 season, and causing him to miss all of 2013 as well.

Later career
Carignan signed a minor league deal with the San Francisco Giants in December 2013. He played the whole season in the minors, totaling 16 appearances. He became a free agent after the 2014 season. In 2015, Carignan pitched in the Atlantic League of Professional Baseball. He announced his retirement on January 29, 2016.

Personal life
Carignan's great-grandfather Gus Dugas played in MLB in the early 1930s as an outfielder for the Pittsburgh Pirates, Philadelphia Phillies, and Washington Senators.

References

External links

1986 births
Living people
Baseball players from Connecticut
Bourne Braves players
Fresno Grizzlies players
Kane County Cougars players
Leones del Caracas players
American expatriate baseball players in Venezuela
Major League Baseball pitchers
Midland RockHounds players
North Carolina Tar Heels baseball players
Oakland Athletics players
Phoenix Desert Dogs players
Richmond Flying Squirrels players
Sacramento River Cats players
Somerset Patriots players
Sportspeople from New London, Connecticut
Stockton Ports players